Sophie Rostopchine, Countess of Ségur, born Sofiya Feodorovna Rostopchina (1 August 1799 in Saint Petersburg – 8 February 1874 in Paris), was a French writer of Russian birth and origin. She is best known today for her novel Les Malheurs de Sophie (Sophie's misfortunes), intended for children.

Life
Her father Count Fyodor Rostopchin was lieutenant-general and, later, Minister of Foreign Affairs for Russia. In 1812, he was governor of Moscow during the invasion of the Grande Armée under Napoleon I of France. While facts concerning the origin of the great fire of Moscow are disputed by historians, Sophie Rostopchine's father has been said by some to have organized (despite opposition from the wealthy property-owners in the city) the great fire which forced Napoleon to make a disastrous retreat.

In 1814 the Rostopchine family left Imperial Russia for exile, going first to the Duchy of Warsaw, then to the German Confederation and the Italian peninsula and finally in 1817 to France under the Bourbon Restoration. In France, the father established a salon, and his wife and daughter converted to Roman Catholicism from Russian Orthodoxy.

It was in her father's salon that Sophie Rostopchine met Eugène Henri Raymond, Count of Ségur (Fresnes, Seine-et-Marne on 12 February 1798 – Château de Méry-sur-Oise 15 July 1869), whom she married on 13/14 July 1819. The marriage was largely an unhappy one: her husband was flighty, distant and poor (until being made a Peer of France in 1830), and his infrequent conjugal visits to their château des Nouettes (near L'Aigle, Orne) produced eight children, including Nathalie de Ségur and the father of the historian Pierre de Ségur (Eugène de Ségur is said to have called his wife "la mère Gigogne", or "Mother Gigogne" in reference to a theatre character of 1602, an enormous woman out of whose skirts a crowd of children appeared).

The Comtesse de Ségur wrote her first novel at the age of 58.

Novels
The novels of the Countess of Ségur were published from 1857 to 1872 in the "Bibliothèque rose illustrée" by the publishing house Hachette.  They were collected together in 1990 under the title Œuvres de la comtesse de Ségur in the collection "Bouquins" (publisher: Robert Laffont).
 Un bon petit diable
 Les Malheurs de Sophie
 Diloy le chemineau
 Mémoires d'un âne
 Jean qui grogne et Jean qui rit
 Le Mauvais Génie
 François le bossu
 Les Caprices de Gizelle
 Pauvre Blaise
 La Fortune de Gaspard
 Quel amour d'enfant !
 Les Petites Filles modèles
 La sœur de Gribouille
 Blondine
 Après la pluie, le beau temps
 Les Vacances
 L'auberge de l'Ange Gardien
 Le général Dourakine

References

External links

 
 
 
 
 Life and works of the comtesse de Ségur (in French)
 Link label  Sophie Heywood, Catholicism and Children's Literature: the comtesse de Ségur (1799–1874), Manchester University Press, 2011
 

1799 births
1874 deaths
Converts to Roman Catholicism
Converts to Roman Catholicism from Eastern Orthodoxy
Writers from Saint Petersburg
Counts of Ségur
Countesses of the Russian Empire
French countesses
Emigrants from the Russian Empire to France
French children's writers
French people of Russian descent
Roman Catholic writers
Russian Roman Catholics
Former Russian Orthodox Christians
Women writers from the Russian Empire
French women children's writers
Russian women children's writers
19th-century French women writers
19th-century women writers from the Russian Empire
19th-century novelists from the Russian Empire
19th-century French novelists
Russian women novelists
French women novelists
Russian people of Tatar descent